The United States Space Force is organized by different units: the Space Staff, the field commands, and the space deltas.

The Space Force is organized as one of two coequal military service branches within the Department of the Air Force, the other being the United States Air Force. Both services are overseen by the Secretary of the Air Force, who has overall responsibility for organizing, training, and equipping the Air Force and Space Force.

The military head of the Space Force is the chief of space operations (CSO), who is an officer in the grade of general.

Space Staff 

The Space Staff is the headquarters of the U.S. Space Force. Like the U.S. Air Force's Air Staff that is under the Department of the Air Force, it is overseen by the Office of the Secretary of the Air Force. It is responsible for developing doctrine, guidance, and plans in performing the Space Force's functions, cooperating with the Air Staff on support issues. It is composed of the military service's most senior leaders: the chief of space operations, the vice chief of space operations, and the chief master sergeant of the Space Force. Like the other services, there is a director of staff who oversees the synchronization of policies and plans of the headquarters staff and four deputy chiefs of space operations.
The Space Staff was designed to be lean. Compared to the Air Force's nine headquarters directorates, the Space Force merged nine functional areas into four directorates. Additionally, each of the four deputy chiefs of space operations has unofficial positional titles akin to that of corporate organizations: chief human capital officer, chief operations officer, chief technology and innovation officer, and chief strategy and resourcing officer. The chief human capital officer and chief technology and innovation officer positions are held by senior civilian officials at the SES-3 level, while both the chief operations officer and chief strategy and resourcing officer positions are filled by two lieutenant generals. 
 Chief of Space Operations (CSO): Gen B. Chance Saltzman
 Vice Chief of Space Operations (VCSO): Gen David D. Thompson
 Director of Staff: Lt Gen Nina M. Armagno
 Deputy Director of Staff: Wade Yamada
  for Personnel (S1): Katharine Kelley
 Assistant DCSO for Personnel: Todd L. Remington
 DCSO for Intelligence (S2): Maj Gen Gregory Gagnon
 Assistant DCSO for Intelligence: Joseph D. Rouge
 DCSO for Operations, Cyber, and Nuclear (S3/4/6/7/10): Lt Gen DeAnna Burt
 Assistant DCSO for Operations, Cyber, and Nuclear: Brig Gen Troy Endicott
 Associate DCSO for Operations, Cyber, and Nuclear: Bruce E. Hollywood
 Mobilization Assistant to the DCSO: Brig Gen Traci Kueker-Murphy, USAF
 DCSO for Strategy, Plans, Programs, Requirements, and Analysis (S5/8): Lt Gen Philip Garrant
 Assistant DCSO for Strategy, Plans, Programs, Requirements, and Analysis: Stephen L. Hart
 Director of Plans and Programs (S8): Brig Gen Jennifer L. Grant, USAF
 Chief of Programming (S8/P): Brig Gen Robert Hutt
 Mobilization Assistant to the DCSO: Brig Gen Damon S. Feltman, USAF
 DCSO for Technology and Innovation (S9): Dr. Lisa Costa
 Assistant DCSO for Technology and Innovation: Col Roy V. Rockwell
 Mobilization Assistant to the CSO: Maj Gen John M. Olson, USAF
 Chief Master Sergeant of the Space Force (CMSSF): CMSSF Roger A. Towberman

Field organization 
The Space Force field organization consist of three different echelons of command: field commands, deltas, and squadrons.

Field Command 
Field commands (FLDCOMs) align with specific mission focuses and are led by officers in the grade of lieutenant general or major general, comparable to the United States Air Force's major command. The Space Force's three field commands will be Space Operations Command (SpOC), Space Systems Command (SSC), and Space Training and Readiness Command (STARCOM).

 Denotes planned unit but not yet activated.

Space Operations Command 

The Space Operations Command (SpOC) will be the primary force provider of space forces and capabilities. It is responsible for the organization, training, equipping, command and control, and employment of space forces to support operational plans and missions for U.S. combatant commanders. It is headquartered at Peterson Space Force Base, Colorado.

Established on 21 October 2020, SpOC was the first field command activated. It was established by the redesignation of the headquarters of the former Air Force Space Command to Space Operations Command. It was composed of the 10 deltas and two garrisons activated on 24 July 2020. This included the Space Training and Readiness Delta (Provisional) which served as the interim unit for space training and education until the August 2021 stand-up of a full field command. SpOC also maintained command of the two launch wings, which were later redesignated as launch deltas in 2021, previously under the Air Force Space Command until the establishment of the Space Systems Command.

The 14th Air Force in Vandenberg Space Force Base, California that was temporarily redesignated Space Operations Command upon the creation of the Space Force was inactivated. A new unit, Space Operations Command West (SpOC West), was activated to serve as headquarters of the Combined Force Space Component Command (CFSCC), a subordinate command of the United States Space Command. The SpOC West commander also served as the commander of CFSCC and as the deputy commander of SpOC.

Space Systems Command 

The Space Systems Command (SSC) is becoming responsible for developing, acquiring, and fielding space systems, as well as launch, sustainment, and maintenance of space systems. It also advises Space Force science and technology activities.

The Space Force on 8 April 2021 announced the planned structure of the SSC. Led by a lieutenant general, SSC was to be formed by redesignating the Space and Missile Systems Center, Commercial Satellite Communications Office, and other space systems programs offices transferred into the Space Force, being stood up in summer 2021. On July 29, Michael Guetlein was confirmed as its first commander by the United States Senate.
The ceremony installing him in command of the new SSC  was held August 13, 2021.

Under the new structure, the two launch deltas previously under SpOC were reassigned to SSC under the oversight of the SSC deputy commander. The commander of the Space Launch Delta 45 will take on additional duties as the field command's director of operations.

Space Training and Readiness Command 

The Space Training and Readiness Command was planned to train and educate space professionals, develop combat-ready space forces, and additionally taking on the roles of integrated testing and on-orbit checkout. Initially, before the activation of the command, a Space Training and Readiness Delta was established in July 2020 at Peterson SFB. STARCOM was activated on 23 August 2021, led by a major general. Five subordinate deltas then began being established: one each for training, doctrine and lessons learned, range and aggressor, test and evaluation, and education.

Delta 
The Space Force has no command echelon equivalent of the U.S. Air Force′s numbered air forces, so the next command echelon below field commands is the delta, a single level of command which combines the wing and group command echelons found in the U.S. Air Force. Each delta is organized around a specific function, such as operations, installation support, or training, and is led by an officer in the grade of colonel. Space Deltas are operational organizations, but have no responsibility for base support, which is either the Air Force′s responsibility, or that of the Space Base Deltas, the former Garrisons.

The first 11 deltas in the Space Force initially were assigned to the Space Operations Command. Of those, two were realigned under the Space Systems Command, and the Space Training and Readiness Delta (Provisional) became a separate field command.

 Denotes planned unit but not yet activated.

Squadron 

Below deltas in the Space Force structure are squadrons. Space Force squadrons are focused on specific tactics and are led by an officer in the grade of lieutenant colonel.

History 
On 20 December 2019, Air Force Space Command's principal components were 14th Air Force (Air Forces Strategic) and the Space and Missile Systems Center. At the same time as the creation of the Space Force 14th Air Force was redesignated as Space Operations Command.

On 12 March 2019, the Space Development Agency (SDA), a new space-focused development agency, additional to the Space and Missile Systems Center and the Space Rapid Capabilities Office, was established. It was established under the authority of the under secretary of defense for research and engineering. As of January 2020, the SDA is planned to become part of the U.S. Space Force in October 2022.

In early April 2020, a list of twenty-three units to be transferred from the Air Force to the Space Force was publicly reported. Those units included the 17th Test Squadron, Peterson Space Force Base, Colorado; 18th Intelligence Squadron, Wright-Patterson AFB, OH; the 25th Space Range Squadron, Schriever AFB, CO; the 328th Weapons Squadron, Nellis AFB, NV; the 527th Space Aggressor Squadron, Schriever AFB, CO; the 7th Intelligence Squadron, 659th Intelligence, Surveillance and Reconnaissance Group, 70th ISR Wing, Ft. Meade, Maryland*; Sixteenth Air Force/Advanced Programs*, Schriever AFB, Colorado; the 32nd Intelligence Squadron, Ft. Meade, Maryland*; the 566th Intelligence Squadron, Buckley AFB, Colorado*; the 544th Intelligence, Surveillance and Reconnaissance Group, Group Staff & Detachment 5, Peterson AFB, Colorado; D the 533d Training Squadron, 381st Training Group, Vandenberg AFB, CA (initial training);  the Air Force Research Laboratory (AFRL) Research Lab Mission Execution, Wright-Patterson AFB, Ohio*; the AFRL Space Vehicles Directorate, Kirtland AFB, New Mexico*; the AFRL Rocket Propulsion Division, Edwards AFB, CA; the AFRL Electro-Optical Division, Maui, Hawaii & Kirtland AFB, New Mexico*; the AFRL Sensors Directorate, Wright-Patterson AFB, Ohio*; the Counter-Space Analysis Squadron and the Space Analysis Squadron, collectively half of the Space and Missiles Analysis Group, National Air and Space Intelligence Center, both at Wright-Patterson AFB; the Air Force Operational Test and Evaluation Center Detachment 4, Peterson AFB, CO; and the Air Force Safety Center – Space Safety Division, Kirtland AFB, New Mexico.

Detachment 1, USAF Warfare Center, Schriever AFB, Colorado; Operating Location A, 705th Combat Training Squadron, Schriever AFB, Colorado (ultimately part of the 505th Command and Control Wing), and the National Security Space Institute, Peterson AFB, CO National Security Space Institute, a place for space education became eventually part of the STAR Delta.

In September 2021 it was announced the 53rd Signal Battalion, the U.S. Army Satellite Operations Brigade, and the Naval Satellite Operations Center would be transferred to Space Force.

Heraldry 

Each unit in the Space Force has an emblem in a shape depending on the unit type. Each of the three field commands also have a distinctive color: Platinum Grey for SpOC, Gold for SSC, and Cannes Blue for STARCOM. Unit emblems are trimmed with the color of the field command to which they report. Space Force personnel assigned to National Reconnaissance Office roles will wear insignia trimmed in Black.

See also
Structure of the United States Army
Organization of the United States Marine Corps
Structure of the United States Navy
Structure of the United States Air Force

References

Units and formations of the United States Space Force
Military organizational structures
United States Department of Defense lists